The Cub Scouts are part of the Singapore Scout Association (SSA). They were earlierly known as "Wolf Cubs" in the pre-1966 era when Singapore Scouting was still under the jurisdiction of the Scout Association, UK (then known as the Imperial Headquarters).

History 
The first Wolf Cub Pack in Singapore was started in Outram Road School in 1925 with a single Wolf Cub Patrol led by H.F. Duncanson of the 9th Singapore Troop. When the Japanese Scout Troop was formed later that year, a Wolf Cub Section was included in their infrastructure. 

In 1927, the 3rd Singapore Troop, an offshoot of the 4th Singapore (SJI) Troop, was dissolved and converted into a full-fledged Wolf Cub Pack within the 4th Troop's Structure. The 3rd Troop's name was subsequently assigned to the Oldham Hall Troop formed in 1928. 
 
The Wolf Cub Section however began some time back, on 1 Jan 1914 at St Stephen's Westminster in Great Britain. Over the years, Wolf Cub Packs had begun to sprout up across the British Empire and by 1935, there were over 15,000 Packs with 275,000 Wolf Cubs and 22,000 Cubmasters.  In November 1935, 10 years after the Wolf Cub Section was started in Singapore, 150 Wolf Cubs and 25 Officers made the Grand Wolf Cub's Rally and Campfire on the old race course in Singapore in a splendid celebration of the twenty-first anniversary of the Wolf Cub Section in the world. By that time, there were 13 Wolf Cub Packs in Singapore.

The Wolf Cub's Rally was led by Singapore District Scoutmaster Crickett and was lent a special note by the attendance of Fleet Scoutmaster Lawder, the Scout Commissioner for Malaya, Mr Frank Cooper Sands, the Assistant Commissioner for Malaya, Mr H.R. Cheeseman, the Chief Commissioner for Singapore Mr Cullen and the Assistant Chief Commissioner for Singapore, Rev. R. K. S. Adams.

The name was changed again to "Cub Scouts" in 2005 to better reflect international usage.

The UK term "Cub Scouts" as proposed in the APR was however not adopted in 1969 although the entire progress badge scheme and proficiency badge scheme were embraced with minor amendments to the names. Progress badges were called the "Standards" instead of "Arrows", i.e. the Bronze Standard, Silver Standard and Gold Standard. The "link badge" was known as the "District Commissioner's Award", serving as the highest award for the Cadet Scout category. After 2000, the term "Standards" were again revised to "Arrows" and "Cub Scout" name has replaced that of "Cadet Scout". In 2005, the Singapore Scout Association has updated the Cub Scout Training Scheme, revising the syllabus and giving a new look to the designs of the progress badges. While the "Arrows" are retained, the top progress award is now known as the Akela Award (a wolf's head on a green background), replacing the "link badge" design of the UK.

Cub Scouts in Singapore follow a common Scout Promise and Law unlike the Wolf Cub era when they have a separate set of Cub Promise and Law. Cub Scouts are grouped in "Sixes" distinguished by coloured Turk's head woggles, where they are led by a "Sixer" and an "Assistant Sixer". If the situation calls for it, a "Senior Sixer" would also be appointed. The Cub Scout Leader leads the Cub Scout Unit (or "Pack") with the help of Assistant Cub Scout Leaders and the "Sixers' Council" composed of all the Sixers. At the Headquarters, National Cub Scout Commissioner presides over the Cub Scout Roundtable which oversee training and policy matters related to Cub Scouting.

The uniform of Cub Scouts in Singapore consists of a luminous-green jersey shirt, dark-green shorts, regulation national scarf/group scarf, Six woggle, regulation leather belt, olive-green socks, black shoes and the headdress. Notably, the headdress is the cap version (green with yellow-pipings) used since the inception of Wolf Cubs in the early 1910s. Prior to 1990, the uniform of Singapore's Cadet Scouts is khaki in colour, which was adopted in 1964.

The latest change to this section of Singapore Scouting was unveiled during the National Youth Programme Symposium held in July 2005 by the Singapore Scout Association, where the new name, "Cub Scout", was adopted together with the changes in the training scheme.  Since that year minor amendments have been made to the way the top award was assessed.

Section Leadership 
The section is overseen by the Cub Scout Executive Committee (CubSEC) which is led by the National Cub Scout Commissioner.The team is made up largely of teachers who are also experienced Cub Scout Leaders from various schools.

SSA Promises

The Scout Promise
On my Honour I promise that I will do my best-To do my duty to God and to the Republic of SingaporeTo help other people andTo keep the Scout Law.

The Scout Law 
A Scout is to be trusted.A Scout is loyal.A Scout makes friends, establishes and maintains harmonious relations.A Scout is disciplined and considerate.A Scout has courage in all difficulties.

Mission statement
"Our movement develops youth for purposeful and responsible adulthood, always prepared to serve God, country and humanity."

References

External links

 Official Website of the Singapore Scout Association

Scouting and Guiding in Singapore